Stygobromus lucifugus, the rubious cave amphipod is an extinct species of amphipod crustacean in the family Crangonyctidae. It was first described by Oliver Perry Hay who found it living in a well near Abingdon, Knox County, Illinois, United States, and it was endemic to that state.

References

lucifugus
Freshwater crustaceans of North America
Extinct animals of the United States
Extinct invertebrates since 1500
Extinct crustaceans
Crustaceans described in 1882
Taxa named by Oliver Perry Hay
Taxonomy articles created by Polbot
Endemic fauna of Illinois
Cave crustaceans